Romani music (often referred to as gypsy or gipsy music, which is sometimes considered a derogatory term) is the music of the Romani people who have their origins in northern India but today live mostly in Europe.

Historically nomadic, though now largely settled, the Romani people have long acted as entertainers and tradesmen. In many of the places Romanies live they have become known as musicians. The wide distances travelled have introduced a multitude of influences of: Byzantine, Greek, Arabic, Indian, Persian, Turkish, Slavic, Romanian, German, Dutch, French, Spanish, and even Jewish musical forms.

It is difficult to define the parameters of a unified Romani musical style, as there are many differences in melodic, harmonic, rhythmic and formal structures from region to region. Lyrics to Romani songs are often sung in one or more dialects of the Romani language, and dance frequently accompanies Romani music performance.

The quintessentially Spanish flamenco is to a very large extent the music (and dance, or indeed the culture) of the Romani people of Andalusia.

Apart from Romani music for local use, in Eastern Europe a separate Romani music originated for entertainment at parties and celebrations. This music drew its themes from Hungarian, Romanian, Russian and other sources. Later on it gained popularity in Western Europe, where many Romani orchestras were active, playing sophisticated melodies of East European origin. Probably the most influential Romani musician was Django Reinhardt (1910–1953).

Original Romani music
Original Romani folksongs, not derived from the countries where the Romani live, are relatively rare. This particular folk music is mainly vocal and consists of slow plaintive songs and fast melodies which may be accompanied by dancing. The fast melodies are accompanied with tongue-clacking, hand-clapping, mouth-basses, clicking of wooden spoons and other techniques.

There are five main components that are found throughout Romani music of various territories.  The first is the use of three voices or parts: the melodic line, the terce and the quint either through vocalization or instruments.  The second is syncopation, where the music starts right after a beat while maintaining a consistent rhythm.  The third is having the music played in different phrases, meaning that the entrance and exit of different musical themes are felt at different times throughout a song either through rhythm or instruments.  The fourth is harmony, where a minor chord is used instead of a major chord.  The last is singing, where natural vocal abilities are emphasized.

The development of Romani music dates back to the playing of instruments such as lutes in the late 1400s in Hungary and Italy.  Roma would perform with non-Roma as entertainers in any aspect of performance.  Eventually, as organized religion gained traction, performance became less emphasized and sometimes prohibited for non-Roma populations, so Roma filled all professional entertainment spots.  They also performed at life events such as weddings, baptisms, funerals and circumcisions.  
Because there is no one nation state for Romani, they were often forced to create their own living spaces within the countries they settled.  Musical and cultural influences were taken from the countries where they lived and incorporated into their own music such as instruments, languages and subject matter of the music itself.  Some songs incorporate the Romani language.

Country-related music
Most Romani music is based on the folk music of the countries where the Romani went through or settled. Local music is adopted and performed – usually instrumental – and, slowly, it is transformed into Romani styles, which are usually more complex than the original styles. In its turn, Romani music has greatly influenced the local music. Among these the Hungarian versions have become best known, although examples of Romani music in other countries also endure.

This regional aspect of Romani music is vividly expressed in the documentary Latcho Drom, which follows Romani music from Northern India through Egypt, Turkey, Romania, Hungary, Slovakia, and France, ending in Spain.

Spain
The Romani people of Spain (Iberian Kale people) have contributed significantly to the Andalusian musical tradition known as flamenco. Although it is not, strictly speaking, Romani music, Flamenco is closely associated to this ethnicity and a significant proportion of famous flamenco artists are Iberian Kale people.

Bulgaria
Due to the significant Romani population in Bulgaria, this ethnic group's music is very popular. Chalgamata music is also played by Romani musicians in Bulgaria.

Romania

The Lăutari were traditional Romani musicians, playing at various events (weddings, funerals, etc.)

The manele genre which is very popular in Romania is supported by Romani ethnic musicians, too.

Russia
A choir in Russia was the Sokolovsky choir.

In 1931, a public Romani theatre, Romen Theatre, has been established in Moscow incorporating Romani music and dance into theatrical performances.

Turkey

Romani people are known throughout Turkey for their musicianship. Their urban music brought echoes of classical Turkish music to the public via the meyhane or taverna. This type of fasıl music (a style, not to be confused with the fasıl form of classical Turkish music) coupled with food and alcoholic beverages is often associated with the underclass of Turkish society, though it also can be found in more "respectable" establishments in modern times.

Romanis have also influenced the fasıl itself. Played in music halls, the dance music (oyun havası) required at the end of each fasıl has been incorporated with Ottoman rakkas or belly dancing motifs. The rhythmic ostinato accompanying the instrumental improvisation (ritimli taksim) for the belly-dance parallels that of the classical gazel, a vocal improvisation in free rhythm with rhythmic accompaniment. Popular musical instruments in this kind of fasıl are the clarinet, violin, kanun and darbuka. Clarinetist Mustafa Kandıralı is a well known fasıl musician.

Balkans
A typical type of Romani music is known as Tallava. Tallava was originated by the Roma minority in Kosovo in the 1990s. The genre of Tallava was later adopted among the Ashkali group. Tallava is common among Albania. This genre has influences from other music genres such as Greek (Skiladiko) and Bulgarian (Chalga). It also blended with Turkish (Arabesque), Arabic (Arabic pop music), Serbian (Turbo-folk) and Albanian music.

Hungary

The Rajkó Orchestra and Folk Ensemble is known for preserving Hungarian Roma music, dance and costume culture since 1952. Their work carries on the traditions of century-old generations. Their performances can be seen at a number of venues, among others at the Danube Palace of Budapest during the season between 1 May and 31 October.

Another notable Roma music formation is Ando Drom. Established by Jenő Zsigó in 1993, the Ando Drom Foundation serves to promote Romany art, encourage young talent and to allow the Romany encounter their own culture within the community, through the productions of the band Ando Drom, among others, a group pioneering the reinterpretation of Romany music and dance. Their music is contemporary in nature. Besides authentic Romany folk songs, they play a kind of urban Romany music which gives a voice to the present-day reality of the community. They avoid reconstructing the manners of old musicians and singers or their style.

Traditionally there are two types of Romani music: one rendered for non-Romani audiences, the other is made within the Romani community.  The music performed for outsiders is called "gypsy music", which is a colloquial name that comes from Ferenc Liszt. They call the music they play among themselves "folk music". Although Romani musicians in Hungary were mentioned in books since the 15th century, musicianship as an occupation didn't become widespread among the Roma until the latter half of the 18th century. The Roma started to develop an ethnic music culture from the 1970s and they obtained national minority status in Hungary. Two famous Romani musicians of the 18th century were Mihály Barna and Panna Cinka. The band of the latter had two violins ("prim" and "kontra"), a cimbalom, and double-bass.

The boom of Romani music in the last decades of the 18th century was triggered by the Hungarian nationalist movement. New genres started to evolve in music, and dance. Romani bands performed in more places, such as parks, promenades. Patronized by aristocrats, Romani musicians started to learn more about Viennese classicism and European musical culture. The unique harmonization of Hungarian "gypsy music" started to differ from its Balkanian counterpart. This was one major factor of the Western European success of Hungarian "gypsy music". This music was exotic, but still accessible for the masses. Another contributory factor for success was the tradition of playing without scores. This further popularized the Romani musicians since they learned and play music by ear. Romani bands first consisted of strings, harp and duda. Later on harp was replaced with cimbalom. The harmonies accompanying the melodies became more dominant in their music. Duda was replaced by clarinet and tárogató. The instrumentation was impacted by Western classical influences, so the most popular form was: two violins (prímás and kontrás), cimbalom, double bass. Bigger bands had clarinet, cello, and later another violin (tercprímás).

In the early 19th century, Romani musicians became the representatives of national music. During the Hungarian Revolution of 1848 in Hungary, Romani bands played their music for soldiers before and after the battle to encourage and entertain them. After the loss of the war, these musicians gained a lot of respect from the country. Romani music became the symbol of desired freedom. A new genre called magyar nóta evolved by around the middle of the century. The composers of the time wanted to sound more like Western European music by extending the folksong form and adopting some elements of Western style. This genre was also performed by Romani musicians, thus it started to be labelled as "gypsy music" as well. The most famous Romani composer of this century was Pista Danko (1858–1903).

Western Europe

The sophisticated music of the Romani orchestras that visited Western Europe became popular in the second half of the 19th century and had its heyday from the 1920s onwards to about 1960, although this music remains popular still today. The tours of rajkó-orchestras – featuring young Romani-musicians – added much to its popularity. The rajkó boys were both endearing and virtuoso, a combination that enchanted the public.

The cimbalom, unknown to the Western audience, added its characteristic sound to the violins played in a Romani style. Romani virtuoso like Bela Babai, Lajos Veres, the many members of the Lakatos family and others became famous. Nowadays the names of Roby Lakatos, Buffo Sandor and Sandor Jaroka still are household names for the Western connoisseurs of this type of music. In Viena in the early 2000s there started a Balkan Boom, the Balkan Fever Festival was established by Richard Schuberth, an austrian author and admirer of the balkanic cultures, who promoted Romani artists who live in Viena, just as Martin Lubenov from Bulgaria, Adrian Gaspar from Romania or Hidan Mamudov from Macedonia.

Since 2014, an E.U.-supported project named Music4Rom has highlighted the importance of the Romani music in classical music. Jorge Chaminé is one of the founders of this project. The values promoted by Music4Rom include recognition, understanding of others, creativity, tolerance and admiration. The project promotes Romani values to build intercultural bridges, social inclusion and children's education through music.

Mainstream classical western music, including Johannes Brahms' clarinet quintet, has incorporated Romani musical practices.

See also
Flamenco
Romani jazz
Romani punk
Lăutari
Romani anthem
Romani society and culture
Pretty Loud
Romany hip hop

References

Bibliography
Broughton, Simon, "Kings and Queens of the Road". 2000. In Broughton, Simon and Ellingham, Mark with McConnachie, James and Duane, Orla (Ed.), World Music, Vol. 1: Africa, Europe and the Middle East, pp 146–158. Rough Guides Ltd, Penguin Books. 
Balint Sarosi, "Zigeunermusik" (Gypsy music), Budapest 1970, in English, German, Hungarian

External links
 Romani muzika (blog)
 The largest archive of Romani music on the Internet – 100,000 Romani songs
 Romani music live. A musical tour through Romania